The Football War (colloquial: Soccer War), also known as the Hundred Hours' War or 100 Hour War, was a brief military conflict fought between El Salvador and Honduras in 1969. Existing tensions between the two countries coincided with rioting during a 1970 FIFA World Cup qualifier. The war began on 14 July 1969 when the Salvadoran military launched an attack against Honduras. The Organization of American States (OAS) negotiated a cease-fire on the night of 18 July (hence "100 Hour War"), which took full effect on 20 July. Salvadoran troops were withdrawn in early August.

Context
Although the nickname "Football War" implies that the conflict was due to a football match, the causes of the war go much deeper. The roots were issues over land reform in Honduras and immigration and demographic problems in El Salvador. Honduras has more than five times the area of neighboring El Salvador, but in 1969 the population of El Salvador (3.7 million) was 40 percent larger than that of Honduras (2.6 million). At the beginning of the 20th century, Salvadorans had begun migrating to Honduras in large numbers. By 1969, more than 300,000 Salvadorans were living in Honduras. These Salvadorans made up 20 percent of the population of Honduras.

In Honduras, as in much of Central America, a large majority of the land was owned by large landowners or big corporations. The United Fruit Company owned 10 percent of the land, making it hard for the average landowner to compete. In 1966 United Fruit banded together with many other large companies to create la Federación Nacional de Agricultores y Ganaderos de Honduras (FENAGH; the National Federation of Farmers and Livestock-Farmers of Honduras). FENAGH was anti-peasantry (against the campesino) as well as anti-Salvadoran. This group put pressure on the Honduran president, Gen. Oswaldo López Arellano, to protect the property of wealthy landowners.

In 1962 Honduras successfully enacted a new land reform law. Fully enforced by 1967, this law gave the central government and municipalities much of the land occupied illegally by Salvadoran immigrants and redistributed it to native-born Hondurans as specified by the Land Reform Law. The land was taken from both immigrant farmers and squatters regardless of their claims to ownership or immigration status. This created problems for Salvadorans and Hondurans who were married. Thousands of Salvadoran laborers were expelled from Honduras, including both migrant workers and longer-term settlers. This general rise in tensions ultimately led to a military conflict.

Buildup
 	
In June 1969, Honduras and El Salvador met in a two-leg 1970 FIFA World Cup qualifier. There was fighting between fans at the first game in the Honduran capital of Tegucigalpa on 8 June 1969, which Honduras won . The second game, on 15 June 1969 in the Salvadoran capital of San Salvador, which was won 3–0 by El Salvador, was followed by even greater violence. On 27 June 1969 the play-off match took place in Mexico City, which El Salvador won  3–2 after extra time. The same day El Salvador dissolved all diplomatic ties with Honduras, stating that in the ten days since the game in El Salvador 11,700 Salvadorans had been forced to flee Honduras. It said that as Honduras had "done nothing to prevent murder, oppression, rape, plundering and the mass expulsion of Salvadorans", there was little point in maintaining relations. It further claimed that "the government of Honduras has not taken any effective measures to punish these crimes which constitute genocide, nor has it given assurances of indemnification or reparations for the damages caused to Salvadorans".

War

Late in the afternoon of 14 July 1969, the concerted military action began. El Salvador was put on a blackout and the Salvadoran Air Force, using passenger airplanes with explosives strapped to their sides as bombers, attacked targets inside Honduras. Salvadoran air-raid targets included Toncontín International Airport, which left the Honduran Air Force unable to react quickly. The larger Salvadoran Army launched major offensives along the two main roads connecting the two nations and invaded Honduras. The invasion phase was perpetrated by three main contingents: the Chalatenango Theater, the North Theater, and the East Theater. The Chalatenango Theater was based on the northwest side of El Salvador, including the departments of Santa Ana and Chalatenango, across the mountain range close to the border, and the Sumpul River. This was a strategic region due to its rich soil and climate; however, this Theater would not see any fighting as it was to deploy only in case of Honduran penetration into El Salvador. The North Theater was composed of a small unit of armored vehicles and a large amount of manpower. The East Theater was to deploy in the departments of La Unión and Morazán. This Theater was composed of a large mechanized division, armored fighting vehicles such as the M3 Stuart and a large amount of artillery such as the 105mm M101.

Anastasio Somoza Debayle, the president of Nicaragua, helped Honduras by providing weapons and ammunition.

Initially, rapid progress was made by the Salvadoran army within striking distance of the Honduran capital Tegucigalpa. The momentum of the advance did not last, however.

The Honduran Air Force reacted by striking the Salvadoran Ilopango airbase. Honduran bombers attacked for the first time in the morning of 16 July. When the attack began, Salvadoran anti-air artillery started firing, repelling some of the bombers. The bombers had orders to attack the Acajutla port, where the main oil facilities of El Salvador were based. By the evening of 16 July, huge pillars of smoke arose in the Salvadoran coastline from the burning oil depots that had been bombed.

Both sides deployed aircraft of World War II-era design. All planes in the engagement were of U.S. origin. Cavalier P-51D Mustangs, F4U-1, -4 and -5 Corsairs, T-28A Trojans, AT-6C Texans and even C-47 Skytrains converted into bombers saw action. On 17 July Honduran Air Force Corsair pilots Captain Fernando Soto and his wingman Captain Edgardo Acosta engaged two Salvadoran TF-51D Cavalier Mustang IIs which were attacking another Corsair while it was strafing targets south of Tegucigalpa. Soto entered a turning engagement with one Mustang and blew off its left wing with three bursts of 20 mm AN/M3 cannon, killing pilot Captain Douglas Varela when his parachute did not fully deploy. Later that day the pair spotted two Salvadoran FG-1D Goodyear Corsairs. They jettisoned hard point stores before climbing and made a diving attack; Soto set one Corsair on fire only to find its wingman on his tail. An intense dogfight between them ended when Soto entered a Split-S, giving him a firing solution which he used to shoot down Captain Guillermo Reynaldo Cortez, who died when his Corsair exploded. El Salvador continued to fly its surviving Corsairs into 1975; Honduras did not retire its fleet until 1979. The war was the last conflict in which piston-engined fighters fought each other.

Cease-fire
The Honduran government called on the Organization of American States (OAS) to intervene, fearing that the nearing Salvadoran Army would invade the capital Tegucigalpa. The OAS met in an urgent session on 18 July and called for an immediate cease-fire and a withdrawal of El Salvador's forces from Honduras. El Salvador resisted OAS pressure for several days, demanding that Honduras first agree to pay reparations for the attacks on Salvadoran citizens and guarantee the safety of those Salvadorans remaining in Honduras. A cease-fire was arranged on the night of 18 July; it took full effect only on 20 July. El Salvador continued until 2 August to resist pressures to withdraw its troops. Then a combination of pressures led El Salvador to agree to a withdrawal in the first days of August. Those persuasive pressures included the possibility of OAS economic sanctions against El Salvador and the dispatch of OAS observers to Honduras to oversee the security of Salvadorans remaining in that country. The actual war had lasted just over four days, but it would take more than a decade to arrive at a final peace settlement.

Withdrawal
El Salvador withdrew its troops on 2 August 1969. There were heavy pressures from the OAS, threatening debilitating repercussions if El Salvador continued to resist withdrawing their troops from Honduras. Honduras guaranteed Salvadoran President Fidel Sánchez Hernández that the Honduran government would provide adequate safety for the Salvadorans still living in Honduras. Sánchez had also asked that reparations be paid to the Salvadoran citizens as well, but that was never accepted by Hondurans.

Consequences

Both sides of the Football War suffered extensive casualties. Some 300,000 Salvadorans were displaced; many had been forcibly exiled or had fled from war-torn Honduras, only to enter an El Salvador in which the government was not welcoming. Most of these refugees were forced to provide for themselves with very little assistance. Over the next few years, more Salvadorans returned to their native land, where they encountered overpopulation and extreme poverty.

El Salvador suffered about 900 mostly civilian dead. Honduras lost 250 combat troops and over 2,000 civilians during the four-day war. Most of the war was fought on Honduran soil and thousands more were made homeless. Trade between Honduras and El Salvador had been greatly disrupted, and the border officially closed. This damaged the economies of these nations tremendously and threatened the Central American Common Market (CACM).
The war resulted in a 22-year suspension of the CACM, a regional integration project that had been set up by the United States largely as a means of counteracting the effects of the Cuban Revolution.
The political power of the military in both countries was reinforced. In the Salvadoran legislative elections that followed, candidates of the governing National Conciliation Party (Partido de Conciliación Nacional, PCN) were largely drawn from the ranks of the military. Having apologized for their role in the conflict, they proved very successful in elections at the national and local levels. In contrast to the gradual democratization process that had characterized the 1960s, the military establishment would exercise increasing control.
The social situation in El Salvador worsened, as the government proved unable to satisfy the economic needs of its citizens deported from Honduras. The resulting social unrest was one of the causes of the Salvadoran Civil War, which followed approximately a decade later in which 70,000 to 80,000 died and a further 8,000 more disappeared.

Aftermath
Although it had initiated the war, El Salvador played in the World Cup; it was eliminated after losing its first three matches (USSR, Mexico and Belgium).

Eleven years after the conflict the two nations signed a peace treaty in Lima, Peru on 30 October 1980 and agreed to resolve the border dispute over the Gulf of Fonseca and five sections of land boundary through the International Court of Justice (ICJ). In 1992, the Court awarded most of the disputed territory to Honduras, and in 1998, Honduras and El Salvador signed a border demarcation treaty to implement the terms of the ICJ decree. In the Gulf of Fonseca the court found that Honduras held sovereignty over the island of El Tigre, and El Salvador over the islands of Meanguera and Meanguerita.

The dispute continued despite the ICJ ruling. At a meeting in March 2012 President Porfirio Lobo of Honduras, President Otto Pérez of Guatemala, and President Daniel Ortega of Nicaragua all agreed that the Gulf of Fonseca would be designated as a peace zone. El Salvador was not at the meeting. However, in December 2012, El Salvador agreed to a tripartite commission of government representatives from El Salvador, Honduras, and Nicaragua that was to take care of territorial disputes through peaceful means and come up with a solution by 1 March 2013. The commission did not meet after December, and in March 2013 stiff letters threatening military action were exchanged between Honduras and El Salvador.

See also

Guillermo Reynaldo Cortez

References

Further reading
Armstrong, Robert and Janet Shenk. (1982). El Salvador: The Face of a Revolution. Boston: South End Press.
Diamond, Jared. (2012). The World Until Yesterday. New York: Viking.
Durham, William H. (1979). Scarcity and Survival in Central America: Ecological Origins of the Football War. Stanford: Stanford University Press.
Kapuscinski, Ryszard. (1990). The Soccer War. Translated by William Brand. London: Granta Books.
Skidmore, T., and Smith, P. (2001). Modern Latin America (5th edition). New York: Oxford University Press, pg. 343.
Walzer, Michael. (1977). Just and Unjust Wars. New York: Basic Books.

External links

Salvador-Honduras War, 1969
Soccer War 1969
El Salvador vs Honduras, 1969: The 100-Hour War
Land, Island and Maritime Frontier Dispute (El Salvador/Honduras: Nicaragua intervening), International Court of Justice case registry
Application for Revision of the Judgment of 11 September 1992 in the Case concerning the Land, Island and Maritime Frontier Dispute (El Salvador/Honduras: Nicaragua intervening) (El Salvador v. Honduras), International Court of Justice case registry

History of Central America
El Salvador–Honduras relations
Wars involving El Salvador
Wars involving Honduras
Conflicts in 1969
Attacks in Honduras
1969 in El Salvador
1969 in Honduras
July 1969 events in North America
1969 in Central American football
1969–70 in Honduran football
1969 in Salvadoran sport
1969 in Central America
1969 in Honduran sport
El Salvador at the 1970 FIFA World Cup
1970 FIFA World Cup qualification
Honduras national football team
El Salvador national football team
Association football controversies
Politics and sports
Association football riots